Juan Martín del Potro was the two-time  defending champion but chose not to defend his title.

Stefanos Tsitsipas won his first ATP World Tour title, defeating Ernests Gulbis in the final, 6–4, 6–4. With the win, he became the first Greek player to win an ATP title in the organization's 48-year history. Gulbis lost his first ATP Tour final, after six singles titles in a row.

Seeds
The top four seeds receive a bye into the second round.

Draw

Finals

Top half

Bottom half

Qualifying

Seeds

Qualifiers

Lucky loser
  Jürgen Zopp

Qualifying draw

First qualifier

Second qualifier

Third qualifier

Fourth qualifier

References
 Main draw
 Qualifying draw

Singles